Leslie Mann (November 18, 1892 – January 14, 1962) was an American college football player, professional baseball player; and football and basketball coach.  He played outfield in the Major Leagues from 1913 to 1928. He played for the Boston Braves, St. Louis Cardinals, Cincinnati Reds, New York Giants, and Chicago Cubs. He was the head basketball coach at Rice Institute (1919–1920) Indiana University (1922–1924) and Springfield College (1924–1926).  He compiled a career record of 43–30 in five seasons as a head basketball coach.

Early years
Born in Lincoln, Nebraska, Mann attended the Y.M.C.A. College in Springfield, Massachusetts.  He played both football and basketball at Springfield and was regarded as "one of the best football players the training school ever had."

Major League Baseball player
Mann later became a professional baseball player.  From 1913 to 1928, he played for the Boston Braves, St. Louis Cardinals, Cincinnati Reds, New York Giants, and Chicago Cubs. He was a member of the 1914 "Miracle" Braves team that went from last place to first place in two months, becoming the first team to win a pennant after being in last place on the Fourth of July. The team then went on to defeat Connie Mack's heavily favored Philadelphia Athletics in the 1914 World Series. Mann also had an RBI single off Babe Ruth in Game 4 of the 1918 World Series.

Coaching career
Mann also worked for many years as a college football and basketball coach.  From 1914 to 1916, he was a basketball coach at Amherst College. In 1919, he became a coach at Rice Institute in Houston. In February 1922, Mann was hired as an assistant football coach at Indiana.  He also coached the Indiana Hoosiers men's basketball team during the 1922–23 and 1923–24 seasons.  Starting in 1924, Mann was hired as the head basketball coach and assistant football coach at his alma mater, which by then had become Springfield College.

Head Coach Records

Later years
After retiring as a player and coach, Mann became an advocate for baseball as an international sport.  He founded the U.S.A. Baseball Congress, and organized a 20-game tour of Japan in 1935.

Through his efforts, baseball was selected as a demonstration sport in the 1936 Summer Olympics played in Berlin.  Originally, the United States team was scheduled to play a Japanese team, but the Japanese withdrew.  The American team was separated into two squads who competed against each other in a single game.  The "World Champions" lineup beat the "U. S. Olympics" lineup by a score of 6–5 before a crowd of 100,000 people on August 12, 1936.

Mann went on to found the International Baseball Federation, which organized an international championship in England in 1938.  The English team, composed mainly of Canadian college players, won 4 out of 5 games against an amateur American team.  He also organized subsequent championships in Cuba in 1939 and Puerto Rico in 1941. World War II brought Mann's efforts to an end.

Mann also arranged a 33-game tour of South Africa and Rhodesia between November 1955 and February 1956.

He died in Pasadena, California.

Hitting and fielding stats
 1,498 Games
 4,716 At-bats
 1,332 Hits
 677 Runs
 203 Doubles
 106 Triples
 44 Home runs
 503 RBIs
 129 Stolen bases
 324 Bases on balls
 .282 Batting average 
 .332 On-base percentage
 .398 Slugging percentage
 .966 Fielding percentage

See also
 List of Major League Baseball career triples leaders
 List of Major League Baseball annual triples leaders

References

External links

 Leslie Mann at College Basketball at Sports-Reference.com

1892 births
1962 deaths
Amherst Mammoths men's basketball coaches
Boston Braves scouts
Boston Braves players
Buffalo Bisons (minor league) players
Chicago Cubs players
Chicago Whales players
Cincinnati Reds players
Indiana Hoosiers football coaches
Indiana Hoosiers men's basketball coaches
Major League Baseball outfielders
Minor league baseball managers
Nebraska City Forresters players
New York Giants (NL) players
Rice Owls men's basketball coaches
Springfield Pride football coaches
Springfield Pride football players
Springfield Pride men's basketball coaches
Springfield Pride men's basketball players
Seattle Giants players
St. Louis Browns scouts
St. Louis Cardinals players
Sportspeople from Lincoln, Nebraska
Baseball players from Nebraska
Basketball coaches from Nebraska
Basketball players from Nebraska
American men's basketball players
American expatriate sportspeople in England